"All I Need to Know" is a song by British singer-songwriter, Emma Bunton. It was released as the second and final single from her third solo album, Life in Mono (2006). The song was co-written with Jamie Hartman, who is notable for previously writing the hit "All Time Love" for Will Young. First announced by her official site, the single was released physically on 12 February 2007 in the United Kingdom and Ireland. It was also available to download from 5 February 2007. The physical release of this single is a two-track CD, with a remix being available only as an iTunes exclusive. The single entered the UK Singles Chart in the week of 24 February 2007 at number 60 and charted for only one week before falling out, making it the lowest charting single of Bunton's career at the time.

Critical reception
The song received mixed to positive reviews.

Music OMH called the song "similarly arresting", describing it as "a beautifully tender piano ballad that the likes of Lucie Silvas would be well advised to take note of. Fraser McAlpine of TheChartBlog (BBC) explained the composition thus: "the first verse is wafty and piano-led, then there's a quiet chorus, then the drums kick in for a meatier version of same", while adding "the dragging pace and out-dated 'classy' production are going to get really boring, really quickly" and comparing it negatively to Viva Forever. The Guardian deemed it "breathtakingly lovely".

Music video
Directed by Max & Dania, the music video was shot in December 2006 shortly before Christmas in the East End of London. The video features Bunton as an angel watching over various lonely people, none of whom can see her.

The only trace of her presence are floating feathers that come from her wings, which are only observable as reflections or from a distance.

The video was originally inspired by the photography of Peter Lindbergh, who is one of the world's preeminent fashion photographers.

Track listings and formats
These are the formats and track listings of major single releases of "All I Need to Know".

UK CD
 "All I Need to Know"  - 3:36
 "Midnight and Martinis" - 4:14

UK iTunes
 "All I Need to Know"  – 3:36
 "All I Need to Know"  – 6:53
 "Midnight and Martinis" – 4:14

UK radio promo
 "All I Need to Know"  – 3:36

UK club promo
 "All I Need to Know"  – 6:53
 "All I Need to Know"  – 6:39
 "All I Need to Know"  – 7:15
 "All I Need to Know"  – 3:24
 "All I Need to Know"  – 3:36

19 Management internal CD-R1
 "All I Need to Know"  – 3:29

1

Charts

References

2006 songs
2007 singles
Pop ballads
Emma Bunton songs
Songs written by Jamie Hartman
Songs written by Emma Bunton
Universal Records singles
Music videos directed by Max & Dania